Aaron Cunningham (born 4 April 1993) is an Irish hurler who plays as a right corner-forward for the Clare senior team.

Cunningham joined the team during the 2012 championship and immediately became a regular member of the starting fifteen. A Munster medalist in the minor grade and a 3 time All-Ireland medalist in the under-21 grade, he has won a National Hurling League and All Ireland senior Championship medal at senior level.

At club level Cunningham plays with Wolfe Tones na Sionna.

Cunningham attended NUI Galway.

References

1993 births
Living people
Alumni of the University of Galway
Clare inter-county hurlers
Irish schoolteachers
Wolfe Tones na Sionna hurlers